Phoenix Country Club is a country club in the southwestern United States, located in Phoenix, Arizona. The club was founded  in 1899 and was moved to its current location in 1921. Golf Connoisseur Magazine rated Phoenix Country Club among top 100 Most Prestigious Private Clubs in America in 2006. The club was chosen for the “ultimate mix of course, history, membership, tradition and class.” In 2009 and  2014, PCC was selected by its peers as a Platinum Club of America. The original golf course designed by Harry Collis was redesigned by Tom Lehman and John Fought in 2002.

History

Phoenix Country Club was officially incorporated on October 25, 1900 by a 12-member board including Webster Street, Chief Justice of the Arizona Territorial Supreme Court; and Dwight B. Heard, president of the Arizona Cotton Association. On October 29, 1919, the club voted to purchase a 160-acre tract of land at 7th Street and Thomas Road for the construction of a new club with and 18-hole golf course, tennis grounds, and a club house. This new property was to become the current location for the club. The land was purchased for $56,000.

Golf course designer Harry Collis, of the Flossmoor Country Club in Chicago was hired to design the layout for the new course in 1920. Los Angeles-based Landscape Architect Lloyd Wright designed the landscape gardening plans for the course. A former employee of the landscape architectural firm of Olmsted Brothers, Wright was the son of architect Frank Lloyd Wright and was noted for his landscape design of the Panama-California Exposition in San Diego, and later became a production designer for Paramount Studios. To fund the construction of the new $200,000 club facilities, 52 homesites were incorporated into the plans for the new location and are known as "Country Club Estates."

The new club opened on October 27, 1921. A white tie ball celebrating the opening of the new club was held on October 28 and was restricted to membership. The following day, the golf course was inaugurated with a men's golf tournament alongside a bridge tournament for female members. The original clubhouse was of brick, painted white, with red tile roofing. It was of the Spanish Colonial style of architecture, the main portion of the structure facing a southwesterly direction. From this main portion were two wings, on at each end extending in northeasterly and southeasterly directions, respectively.

The building featured a main reception hall, ballroom, and banquet hall; men's and women's locker facilities and showers; a men's grill room; a dining room; large ornamented tile fireplaces; French doors; and verandas where afternoon tea was commonly served. Also featured were a swimming pool and four tennis courts. The entire structure was designed by Phoenix architectural firm Lescher & Kibbey.

On September 12, 1922, the body of Phoenix Country Club secretary Guy N. Dernier was found, strangled to death and cast into the Arizona Canal. No water was found in his lungs during the autopsy meaning that he had been strangled before he was disposed of in the canal. In his Dodge automobile, parked along the canal bank, were his eyeglasses, watch, purse and articles of clothing. Found among his personal effects was a diary implicating twenty two society women in both Phoenix and Los Angeles with whom he had carried out affairs. Many of the women had compensated him for their liaisons, one paying him $600. Of the twenty two women all were married but one, a widow. Dernier had been an employee of Montgomery Ward in Chicago and came to Phoenix in 1917 for treatment for tuberculosis. He was a members of the Benevolent and Protective Order of Elks. It was the opinion of the police that one of the twenty one husbands of the women with whom Dernier had had an affair was the murderer.

Following the opening of their new club, Phoenix Country Club became the seat of leadership for the Border States Tennis Association, a member of the United States Lawn Tennis Association with members in Arizona, New Mexico, Sonora, and Texas. The president and treasurer of the association were members Dwight B. Heard and Mrs. Ernest W. Lewis, respectively. The Phoenix Open was first hosted at Phoenix Country Club in 1932 but was discontinued after the 1935 tournament. The rebirth of the Phoenix Open came in 1939 when member Bob Goldwater Sr. convinced fellow Thunderbirds to help run the event. The Thunderbirds, a prominent civic organization in Phoenix, were not as enthusiastic about running the event as he was, leaving Goldwater Sr. to do most of the work in getting a golf open started. Beginning in 1955, the Arizona Country Club alternated as event host with Phoenix Country Club; this arrangement lasted until Phoenix Country Club took The Arizona Country Club's turn in 1975 and became the event's permanent home again.

The tournament was moved in 1987 to its current home, the Stadium Course at TPC of Scottsdale, northeast of downtown Phoenix. During its time as host of the Phoenix Open, the club hosted such notable golfers as Ben Hogan, Byron Nelson, Jack Nicklaus, Arnold Palmer, Gene Littler, Johnny Miller, Miller Barber, Ben Crenshaw, Hal Sutton, and many others. The club also hosted the Western Open in 1941 and 1942.

In 1961, a new contemporary clubhouse designed by the architectural firm Edward L. Varney & Associates was constructed adjacent to the old clubhouse at a cost of $1,000,000. The new clubhouse is 68,000 square feet in size and features a second floor with 35 guest rooms, larger kitchen and dining facilities and larger locker room facilities. A new swimming pool and seven additional tennis courts were also constructed. The original clubhouse was demolished soon after the completion of the new clubhouse and was replaced with a new terrace. The 1961 clubhouse continues to serve as the clubhouse for Phoenix Country Club.

In 2002, the 80-year-old Collis course was redesigned by Tom Lehman and John Faught.

In 2017, Phoenix Country Club became the host of the Charles Schwab Cup Championship, the season finale of the PGA Tour Champions.

In 2019, the club hosted the Arizona Tennis Classic, an ATP Challenger Tour men's tennis tournament.

Notable Members
Notable current and former members Include:

Emil Ganz (1838-1922),  Businessman and three-time mayor of Phoenix, Arizona
Webster Street (1846-1908), Chief Justice of the Arizona Territorial Supreme Court from 1897 till 1902
Oakes Murphy (1849-1908), Fourteenth Governor of Arizona Territory
Richard Elihu Sloan (1857-1933), Associate Justice of the Arizona Territorial Supreme Court, a United States District Court judge and as the 17th and final Governor of Arizona Territory
Dwight B. Heard (1869-1929), Rancher and president of the Arizona Cotton Association famous for publishing the Arizona Republican, now The Arizona Republic, from 1912 to 1929
Ernest W. Lewis (1875-1927), Associate Justice of the Arizona Territorial Supreme Court from 1909 till Arizona statehood in 1912
Del Webb (1899-1974), Real estate developer and a co-owner of the New York Yankees known for founding and developing the retirement community of Sun City, Arizona, and for many works of his company, the Del Webb Corporation
Barry Goldwater (1909-1998), five-term United States Senator from Arizona (1953–65, 1969–87) and the Republican Party's nominee for President of the United States in the 1964 election
William G. Bennett (1924-2002), former chairman of Circus Circus Enterprises and owner of the Sahara Hotel and Casino
Earl H. Carroll (1925-2017), United States federal judge in senior status, for the United States District Court for the District of Arizona
Joan Ganz (1929-), Co-creator of the children's television show Sesame Street and granddaughter of member Emil Ganz
Bill Bidwill (1931-), Principal owner and chairman of the board of the Arizona Cardinals
Jerry Colangelo (1939-), Former owner of the Phoenix Suns of the NBA and the Arizona Diamondbacks of Major League Baseball
Connie Hawkins (1942-2017), Former power forward for the Phoenix suns
Jim Pederson (1942-), Co-founder of the commercial development firm The Pederson Group, and Chairman of the Arizona Democratic Party from 2001 to 2005
Betsy Bayless (1944-), 16th Secretary of State of Arizona from September 5, 1997 until January 6, 2003
Alice Cooper (1948-), American singer, songwriter, musician and occasional actor
Grant Woods (1954-), Attorney general of Arizona from 1991 until 1999
Ryne Sandberg (1959-), Former professional baseball player, coach, and manager
Dennis K. Burke (1962-), Former United States Attorney for the District of Arizona
Michael Bidwill (1964-), President of the Arizona Cardinals and son of member Bill Bidwill

Historic Residences
Of the 52 homesites in Country Club Estates, 48 are still single family homes. Many of those 48 homes were constructed prior to World War II and are therefore eligible for historic registration. Of 48 homes, 4 are listed on the national register of historic places.

|}

References

Phoenix, Arizona
Athletics clubs in the United States
Clubs and societies in the United States
Golf clubs and courses in Arizona
Sports organizations established in 1900
Sports venues in Phoenix, Arizona
Sports venues completed in 1921
Tennis venues in the United States
Tennis clubs
1899 establishments in Arizona Territory